The Notre Dame Institute is a high school in the Philippines.

In 1947, Rev. Enrique Dulay with a group of town leaders—including Francisco Abena, Juana D. Diaz, Enrique Calub, Esperanza Pulido, Gregoria D. Yaranon, Demetrio Bautista, Alipio Diaz, and Isidro Floreza—founded the first high school of the town. The foundation of the school coincided with the feast of Our Lady of Lourdes, and was named Notre Dame in honor of the Virgin Mary. With the construction of the FACOMA building, the school started with a class for each of the four grades of high school. Notre Dame graduated its first students one year later in 1948.

As enrollment grew, new buildings were built on farmland east of the national highway. The school relocated to its present site to accommodate a growing student body. This new building was destroyed less than 30 years later by the 1990 Luzon earthquake, along with its centuries-old church and rectory. The school continued to operate with scattered makeshift shelters, or under the shade of trees until construction of the new building was completed.

Schools in La Union